Figure Skating is a sport in which individuals, pairs, or groups perform on figure skates on ice. Although ice skating began in 3,000 BCE in Scandinavia, American Edward Bushnell's 1855 invention of steel blades and Jackson Haines bringing elements of ballet to figure skating were critical to the development of modern-day figure skating.  Since then, figure skating in the United States has grown to have 186,038 members as of the 2020–2021 season.

Overview 
The governing body of figure skating in the United States is US Figure Skating,"U.S. Figure Skating is a member of the International Skating Union (ISU), the international federation for figure skating; and the United States Olympic & Paralympic Committee (USOPC)." U.S. figure skating, along with USA Hockey, endorses Learn to Skate USA, which provides lessons in the basics of skating, including for ice hockey, speed skating, multiple disciplines of figure skating, along with adaptive skating for skaters with disabilities. U.S. Figure Skating also contains a series of levels and testing for skaters beyond Learn to Skate USA. In addition, U.S. Figure Skating also governs collegiate skating, including intercollegiate competitions, collegiate championships, and collegiate synchronized skating. The membership demographics of U.S. Figure Skating are 69% female and 27% male. In addition, Ice Sports Industry "an international industry trade association" hosts competitions, runs learn to skate programs, and offers an alternate set of levels to US Figure Skating.

Ice skating used to be a popular television sport in the United States but has fallen out of favor since the 1970s, and the number of medals they have won at the winter Olympics has declined. This may be partially in response to the financial crisis, as figure skating has always been an expensive sport, as well as in response to the retirement of Michelle Kwan and decline in the international success of the United States with the growing success of the vastly different Russian program.

History

During the 1860s, Jackson Haines created and popularized figure skating in the United States.

In 1914, the first U.S. Figure Skating Championships were held.

In 1928, Maribel Vinson set the record for most U.S. national championship titles at 9. Michelle Kwan has since tied this record.

At the 1948 Olympics, American Dick Button became the first person to land a double axel in competition, having only landed it for the first time days earlier. He then became the first to land a triple jump in competition at the Oslo 1952 Olympic Winter Games.

In 1953, Tenley Albright became the first American woman to win a world championship title. In 1956, she became the first American woman to win an Olympic gold medal.

In 1956, synchronized skating was founded in Ann Arbor Michigan by Dr. Richard J. Porter. His team, the Hockettes began skating in between the periods at University of Michigan hockey games.

In 1961, the United States world team was headed to the World Championships in when their flight, Sabena Flight 548 crashed, killing the entire world team.

In 1976, Dorothy Hamill became the last female skater to win Olympic gold without including a triple jump.

In 1984, the first United States Synchronized Skating Championships was held.

In July 1990, the ISU stopped including figures as part of competitions, impacting American and International competitions.

In 1992, Kristin Yamaguchi became the first Asian American woman to win an Olympic gold medal in figure skating, and in 1998, she became the first Asian American to be inducted into the World Figure Skating Hall of Fame.

The 1994 Cobo Arena attack on Nancy Kerrigan increased nationwide interest in figure skating. The controversy itself sparked public interest, as did the quality of women's skating at the time, and figure skating was very popular in the 1990s. Tonya Harding, whose ex-husband was charged with orchestrating the attack on Kerrigan, was the first American woman to land a triple axel in competition. The eventual Olympic competition between Kerrigan and Harding set ratings records. Harding was eventually implicated in the attack, and forced to renounce her membership in U.S. Figure Skating and was barred from the organization.

In 1996 Tara Lipinski became the youngest person to win the world championship, and in 1998, she became "the youngest winner of an individual event in the history of the Winter Games".

From 1996 to 2005, Michelle Kwan won the U.S. national championships 9 times and won the World Championships 5 times. Although she never won Olympic gold, she did win a silver in 1998 and bronze medal in 2002. She is the most decorated American woman in figure skating.

Beginning in 2004 and fully implemented by 2006, the ISU implemented the ISU Judging system, a new code of points replacing the old 6.0 system and used in both American and international competition.

In 2018, Mirai Nagasu became first ever U.S. woman to land the triple axel in Olympic competition.

In 2019, then 13 year-old Alysa Liu became the youngest U.S. women's figure skating champion.

As of the 2020 U.S. synchronized skating championships, synchronized skating team the Haydenettes have won a total of 28 US national titles, and have won the last 11 US championships at the senior level.

Current Senior Team Representing the United States 
Currently, the team of senior skaters representing the United States consists of Starr Andrews, Maxine Marie Bautista,  Mariah Bell, Amber Glenn, Karen Chen, Gabriella Izzo Alysa Liu, Sierra

Venetta, Bradie Tennell, Audrey Shin and Paige Rydberg in the ladies category, Jason Brown, Nathan Chen, Tomoki Hiwatashi, Jimmy Ma, Maxim Naumov, Yaroslav Paniot, Camden Pulkinen, Andrew Torgashev, Dinh Tran and Vincent Zhou in the men's category, Valentina Plazas and Maximiliano Fernandez, Katie McBeath and Nathan Bartholomay, Audrey Lu and Misha Mitrofanov, Chelsea Liu and Danny O'Shea, Alexa Knierim and Brandon Frazier, Emily Chan and Spencer Howe, Jessica Calalang and Brian Johnson, and Ashley Cain-Gribble and Timothy LeDuc in pairs, and Caroline Green and Michael Parsons, Kaitlin Hawayek and Jean-Luc Baker, Madison Hubbell and Zachary Donohue, Lorraine McNamara and Anton Spiridonov, and Eva Pate and Logan Bye in ice dance. This includes skaters "includes athletes in the A, B and C team envelope, as well as athletes with international assignments". The current senior level synchronized skating teams are The Haydenettes, The Skyliners, Miami University, Adrian College, and the Crystallettes.

References